Osornophryne puruanta is a species of toads in the family Bufonidae. It is endemic to Ecuador.

References

puruanta
Amphibians of Ecuador
Amphibians of the Andes
Amphibians described in 2008